Larry Donell Hall Jr. (born May 22, 1983) is an American professional basketball player who last played for Dresden Titans of the ProB.

References

External links
 at Eurobasket.com
 at RealGM.com

1983 births
Living people
Basketball players from Long Beach, California
American men's basketball players
Guards (basketball)
Western Oregon Wolves men's basketball players
BC Nokia players
BC Tsmoki-Minsk players
BC Rakvere Tarvas players
BC Cherkaski Mavpy players
BC Politekhnika-Halychyna players
Korvpalli Meistriliiga players
American expatriate basketball people in Finland
American expatriate basketball people in Slovenia
American expatriate basketball people in Estonia
American expatriate basketball people in Lithuania
American expatriate basketball people in Belarus
American expatriate basketball people in Slovakia
American expatriate basketball people in Germany
American expatriate basketball people in Bulgaria
American expatriate basketball people in Switzerland
American expatriate basketball people in Romania
American expatriate basketball people in Ukraine
American expatriate basketball people in North Macedonia